Tift County High School, Northeast Campus is a public, rural high school in Tifton, Georgia, United States. It is part of Tift County High School (TCHS).

History
The school was built in 1970. Originally housing 7th, 8th and 9th grades as Tift County Junior High School, the initial enrollment was 1350 compared to approximately 600 today. Tift County High School, Northeast Campus is now a 9th grade school.

Fine arts
Chorus
Band

Clubs
FBLA
FFA
Beta Club
Y-Club
Yearbook
Model U.N.
VICA/SkillsUSA
HOSA
Student Council and TSA
ROTC

School sports
Northeast plays with Tift County High School, as it is part of that school.

Northeast has many sports, including:
Football
Boys' basketball
Girls' basketball
Boys' soccer
Girls' soccer
Baseball
Softball
Boys' golf
Girls' golf
Football cheerleading
Basketball cheerleading
Competition cheerleading
Cross country
Boys' track
Girls' track
Tennis
Wrestling
Swim team
Gymnastics

References

External links
 Tift County High School website
 Tift County Public Schools
  Tift County Touchdown Club

Schools in Tift County, Georgia
Tift County Schools
Public high schools in Georgia (U.S. state)